Margaret Wanjiru is a Kenyan politician and a Bishop at Jesus is Alive Ministries (JIAM).

Career and Political life 
She is also popularly known as 'Mama Na Kazi'. She belongs to Jubilee Party  after leaving ODM party and was elected to represent the Starehe Constituency in the National Assembly of Kenya since the 2007 Kenyan parliamentary election. In 2010-2013 she was appointed into the cabinet as an Assistantant Minister for Housing.

She risked losing her parliamentary seat after a vote recount carried out in 2010 indicated that her opponent Maina Kamanda (PNU) won the election with a clear margin. As a result, a by-election was held on September 20, 2010, but Wanjiru retained the seat beating Kamanda.

Personal life 
She has 3 children : Stephen Kariuki (A politician  who has served as a Kenyan member of parliament representing Mathare constituency ),  Evans Kariuki and Purity Kariuki. She was diagnosed with COVID-19 pandemic on May 21, 2020, that put her in ICU at Nairobi Hospital.

References

Living people
Year of birth missing (living people)
Orange Democratic Movement politicians
Members of the National Assembly (Kenya)
21st-century Kenyan women politicians
21st-century Kenyan politicians